Gustavo Porras Cortés is a politician from Nicaragua who is serving as President of the National Assembly of Nicaragua from January 2017.

Personal life 
He was born in October 11, 1954 and graduated as General practitioner in National Autonomous University of Nicaragua.

References 

1954 births
Presidents of the National Assembly (Nicaragua)
Living people